The Albert Schweitzer Tournament (abbreviated AST), full name Albert Schweitzer Under-18 World Tournament, is an international basketball competition that is played between national basketball teams of the Under-18 men age category. It takes place every two years in Mannheim, Germany, and is contested between teams from 12 countries.

Since FIBA does not organize an Under-18 world championship, the Albert Schweitzer Tournament is internationally recognized and considered an official non-FIBA organized world championship for the Under-18 age group. Originally, the tournament was an Under-19 age event. The organizers of the tournament are the German Basketball Federation and the city of Mannheim. The tournament is named after Albert Schweitzer.

History 
The first Albert Schweitzer Tournament took place in December 1958. It was contested between eight teams, and won by Belgium. Hans-Joachim Babies, and the German basketball pioneer, Hermann Niebuhr, asked the theologian and physician, Albert Schweitzer, if they could use his namesake for the name of the tournament. After the second tournament in 1960, there was a break in play until 1966. From that point onwards, a two-year tournament cycle was established.

From 1958 to 1971, the USA used players that were the dependents of the USA's military forces. Starting with the 1973 tournament, the USA began to use players that were selected from throughout the entire USA school system.

The 1991 tournament was canceled, due to the Gulf War. In 1994, the tournament switched from an Under-19 competition, to an Under-18 competition, and has been held during even-numbered years.

The USA has won the most titles, winning ten. The USA is followed by Italy with four titles. The record attendance was 28,763 spectators.

Due to the spread of COVID-19, the 2020 tournament was cancelled. Due to COVID-19, the 2022 tournament was also cancelled.

Results

Performance by nation

Future stars 
The tournament is an important event for professional basketball scouts from around the world. Over the years, many players who have played at the tournament have gone on to become well-known pro players, both in the NBA, and the EuroLeague.

Some of the NBA players who have played at the AST are:

 Magic Johnson
 Eddie Johnson
 B. J. Armstrong
 Eddie Griffin
 Luke Babbitt
 Kyle Lowry
 Ramon Sessions
 Cole Aldrich
 Vince Carter
 Glen Rice
 Kent Benson
 Kevin Garnett
 Joseph Forte
 Carlos Boozer
 Andre Barrett
 Jermaine O'Neal
 Baron Davis
 Tim Duncan
 Robert Sacre
 Facu Campazzo
 Dirk Nowitzki
 Detlef Schrempf
 Daniel Theis
 Paul Zipser
 Tony Parker
 Jérôme Moïso
 Ronny Turiaf
 Boris Diaw
 Johan Petro
 Rudy Gobert
 Evan Fournier
 Nicolas Batum
 Alexis Ajinça
 Pau Gasol
 Raül López
 Víctor Claver
 Willy Hernangómez
 Toni Kukoč
 Dražen Petrović
 Dino Rađja
 Igor Rakočević
 Miroslav Raduljica
 Dario Šarić
 Bruno Šundov
 Zoran Planinić
 Bojan Bogdanović
 Uroš Slokar
 Victor Khryapa
 Andrei Kirilenko
 Šarūnas Jasikevičius
 Darius Songaila
 Arvydas Sabonis
 Svi Mykhailiuk
 Hedo Türkoğlu
 Memo Okur
 Ersan İlyasova
 Enes Kanter
 Furkan Aldemir
 Cedi Osman
 Kostas Papanikolaou
 Andreas Glyniadakis
 Antonis Fotsis
 Vassilis Spanoulis
 Omri Casspi
 Gal Mekel
 Deni Avdija
 Yi Jianlian
 Patrick Mills
 David Andersen
 Andrew Bogut
 Matthew Dellavedova
 Mitch Creek

In addition, some of the players who have played in various international senior men's professional top-tier national domestic leagues and who have also played at the AST are:

 Chuck Eidson
 Erving Walker
 Lamont Barnes
 Chris Burgess
 Kevin Freeman
 Mark Karcher
 Ethan Happ
 Ismet Akpinar
 Robin Benzing
 Richard Freudenberg
 Niels Giffey
 Kostja Mushidi
 Maik Zirbes
 Jonas Mattisseck
/ Ziyed Chennoufi
 Andrew Albicy
 Antoine Diot
 Edwin Jackson
 Adrien Moerman
 Kim Tillie
 Joseph Gomis
 Mam Jaiteh
 Juan San Epifanio "Epi"
 Albert Miralles
 Quino Colom
 Josep Franch
 Pierre Oriola
 Alberto Díaz
 Tomislav Zubčić
 Leon Radošević
 Mario Delaš
 Toni Prostran
 Andrija Žižić
 Milan Mačvan
 Nikola Radičević
 Nikola Rebić
 Dušan Ristić
 Mihajlo Andrić
 Stefan Lazarević
 Stefan Marković
 Nikola Milutinov
 Boriša Simanić
 Erazem Lorbek
 Sergiy Gladyr
 Igors Miglinieks
 Valery Tikhonenko
 Fedor Likholitov
 Andrey Desyatnikov
 Mikhail Kulagin
 Martynas Gecevičius
 Ludde Hakanson
 Doğuş Balbay
 Deniz Kılıçlı
 Egemen Güven
 Ender Arslan
 Kerem Tunçeri
 Antonello Riva
 Pietro Aradori
 Federico Mussini
 Dino Meneghin
 Diego Flaccadori
 Idan Zalmanson
 Nikos Zisis
 Charis Giannopoulos
 Georgios Bogris
 Vangelis Mantzaris
 Leonidas Kaselakis
 Nikos Pappas
 Kostas Sloukas
 Vlado Janković
 Linos Chrysikopoulos
 Dimitrios Katsivelis
 Nondas Papantoniou
 Sofoklis Schortsanitis
 Lazaros Papadopoulos
 Christos Tapoutos
 Michalis Lountzis
 Dimitrios Moraitis
 Kostas Papadakis
 Charis Markopoulos
 Dimitrios Agravanis
 Lefteris Bochoridis
 Chen Jianghua
 Andrew Ogilvy
 Tai Webster

Awards

MVP Award

Burkhard Wildermuth Prize 
The Burkhard Wildermuth Prize, or Burkhard Wildermuth Award, was first awarded in 2006, and is given to the player in each tournament that is deemed to be the "Most Talented Player". The award is named after Dr. Burkhard Wildermuth, the long-time co-organizer of the Albert Schweitzer Tournament.

All-Tournament Team 

2000:
 Charis Markopoulos
 Misan Haldin
 Christos Tapoutos
 Victor Khryapa
 Jacob Holmes
2006:
 Doğuş Balbay
 Nicolas Batum
 Omri Casspi
 Miroslav Raduljica
 Alexis Ajinça
2008:
 Erving Walker
 Nikos Pappas
 Tomislav Zubčić
 Deniz Kılıçlı
 Enes Kanter
2010:
 Jackson Aldridge
 Evan Fournier
 Hugh Greenwood
 Mitch Creek
 Philipp Neumann
2012:
 Nikola Radičević
 Josep Pérez
 Paul Zipser
 Mihajlo Andrić
 Willy Hernangómez
2014:
 Federico Mussini
 Ludde Hakanson
 Stefan Lazarević
 Ethan Happ
 Egemen Güven
2016:
 Davide Moretti
 Aleksa Radanov
 Richard Freudenberg
 Boriša Simanić
 Zhu Rongzhen
2018:
 Jonas Mattisseck
 Federico Miaschi
 Nikita Mikhaylovsky
 Callum Dalton
 Hendrik Drescher

See also 
TBF Under-16 World Cup
FIBA Under-17 World Cup
FIBA Under-19 World Cup

References

External links 
Official Website 
Official Archive Website 
Albert Schweitzer Tournament History 
Albert Schweitzer Tournament Stars 
Albert Schweitzer Tournament Results 1958–2008 
Albert Schweitzer Tournament Results 2010 
Albert Schweitzer Tournament Results 2012 
2012 Tournament schedule and results
Tournament leaders
Detailed statistics
Albert Schweitzer Tournament Results 2014 
2014 Tournament schedule
Detailed statistics
Tournament leaders
Rosters
Media/Scouts information
Albert Schweitzer Tournament Schedule 2016 
Results and standings 
Rosters
Detailed statistics
Tournament leaders
Venue/Direction
Media information
Albert Schweitzer Tournament Results 2018 
2018 Tournament Schedule 
Detailed statistics
Venue/Directions
Media/Scouts information

 
1958 establishments in West Germany
Basketball competitions in Europe between national teams
International youth basketball competitions hosted by Germany
Under-18 basketball competitions between national teams
Under-19 basketball competitions between national teams
Recurring sporting events established in 1958
Sports competitions in Mannheim